Aegaeon may refer to:
Aegaeon (moon), Saturn
Aegaeon (mythology), in Greek mythology
A son of Lycaon
One of the Gigantes
One of the Hecatonchires
Aegaeon (crustacean), a genus of shrimp